Mariyam Shahuza is a Maldivian former film actress.

Career
In 2002, Shahuza appeared in a small role as a doctor in Amjad Ibrahim-directed film Kahvalhah Dhaandhen (2002). Having disappeared from the screen for almost four years, she made a comeback as a gossip loving friend in the horror film Hukuru Vileyrey (2006), co-directed by Aishath Rishmy and Aminath Rasheedha which was based on a novel published by Ibrahim Waheed on Haveeru Daily in 2003. The film being a critical and commercial success was considered as "one of the best horror film the Maldivian Film Industry has ever produced". It was later aired as 15 episodes television series with inclusion of several scenes that were edited out in its theatrical release. This was followed by Amjad Ibrahim's romantic drama film Hithuge Edhun (2006) which narrates the story of a disabled man where she played a guest role of a teacher.

From the year 2006 to 2010, Shahuza mostly appeared in short films from Salhibe series and Vasvaas series to standalone short productions including Umurahves Inthizaaru Kuraanan (2007), The Boat (2008), Dhanthura (2008), Noonekey Nubunaashey (2008), Keehvehey Vakivee Yaaraa? (2010), and Lollypop (2010). During the time, she also starred in several television series including Vimlaa (2007), Hanaa (2008), Kushakaanulaa Shazaa Nudheyshey (2008) and Ssshhh... Miee Sirreh! (2009).

In 2011, she again collaborated with Amjad Ibrahim for his family drama Hithey Dheymee (2011) which received negative reviews from critics and was a box office disaster. A series of flop was continued with Hamid Ali's Laelaa starring Yoosuf Shafeeu, Amira Ismail, Ahmed Easa and Ali. The film revolves around two daughters who were forced to arranged marriages by their parent. The film received negative reviews from critics and was declared a box office failure. She again played a small role in her last release of the year; Yoosuf Shafeeu action drama film Insaaf (2011). The film revolves around the disputes between two districts of an island. Upon release, the film received mixed to positive reviews from critics.

This was followed by several other brief appearances in feature films including Aniyaa (2016), 4426 (2016), Vishka (2017) and Thiya Loaibaa Dhurah (2018). As for the television productions, she had major two releases during the period; Ahmed Saeed's mini-series Furaana Dheynan (2011) and Fathimath Nahula's romantic drama series Vakivumuge Kurin (2015).

Filmography

Feature film

Short film

Television

References 

Living people
People from Malé
21st-century Maldivian actresses
Maldivian film actresses
Year of birth missing (living people)